is a passenger railway station in the city of Mito, Ibaraki Prefecture, Japan operated by the third sector Kashima Rinkai Railway.

Lines
Higashi-Mito Station is served by the Ōarai Kashima Line, and is located 3.8 km from the official starting point of the line at Mito Station.

Station layout
The station consists of a single elevated island platform. The station is unattended.

Platforms

History
Higashi-Mito Station was opened on 14 March 1985 with the opening of the Ōarai Kashima Line.

Passenger statistics
In fiscal 2018, the station was used by an average of 144 passengers daily.

Surrounding area
Mito Kamiono Elementary School

See also
 List of railway stations in Japan

References

External links

 Kashima Rinkai Testudo Station Information 

Railway stations in Ibaraki Prefecture
Railway stations in Japan opened in 1985
Mito, Ibaraki